Nikolai Petrovich Burlyayev (born 3 August 1946) is a Soviet and Russian actor and film director. Born into a family of actors, Burlyayev started his career in film and theatre when he was still a child. He is best known for his title role in Andrei Tarkovsky's Ivan's Childhood. He worked with Tarkovsky again four years later, as Boriska in Andrei Rublev.

He was elected to the State Duma in the 2021 parliamentary elections.

Biography 
Burlyayev majored in acting at the Shchukin theater school in Moscow, graduating in 1967. Burlyayev is a graduate of the Film Directors’ Faculty of VGIK, where he studied under Mikhail Romm and Lev Kulidzhanov. He graduated in 1975. Burlyayev's film acting debut was the lead in Andrei Konchalovsky's short film The Boy and the Dove (1960). As a child actor, Burlyayev impressed audiences with his acting in Igor Talankin's postwar drama Entry (1962) and in Andrei Tarkovsky's Ivan's Childhood (1962). In later years, Burliaev played the teacher with a gambling habit Aleksei Ivanovich in Aleksei Batalov's screen version of Dostoevsky's The Gambler (1972) and Evgeni in Mikhail Shveitser's Little Tragedies (1979, TV, from Aleksandr Pushkin). He also played supporting parts in Petr Todorovski's Frontline Romance (1983) and in Natalia Bondarchuk's dilogy Bambi's Childhood (1985) and Bambi’s Youth (1986). As a filmmaker, Burlyayev debuted with the short Little Vania the Kain (1977) from the omnibus project Old Times in Poshekhonia (1975), the adaptation of a novel by Mikhail Saltykov-Shchedrin.

His later films include Wartime Romance (1983) and Lermontov (1986), where he played the lead.

Since 1991, Burlyayev has been the founder and director of the annual Zolotoi Vityaz (Golden Knight) Moscow Film Festival of Slavic and Orthodox Peoples, and since 1996 he has been the founder and chairman of the International Association of Cinematographers of Slavic and Orthodox Peoples.

In March 2014, he signed a letter in support of the position of the President of Russia Vladimir Putin on Russia's military intervention in Ukraine. Burlyaev emphasizes that he is Orthodox, repeatedly sharply expressed his negative attitude towards people with non-traditional sexual orientation, calls himself a homophobe.

He was married to Natalya Bondarchuk, and is thus the son-in-law of Sergei Bondarchuk and Inna Makarova.

On 24 March 2022, the United States Treasury sanctioned him in response to the 2022 Russian invasion of Ukraine.

Filmography 
 1961: The Boy and the Dove as Boy
1961: Judgment of the Mad as Sam Hagger
1962: Ivan's Childhood as Ivan
1962: No Fear, No Blame as Yura Sorokin
 1963: Introduction to Life as Oleg
1964: The Blizzard as Lancer
1966: Hero of Our Time as Blind man
 1966: Andrei Rublev as Boriska
1966: Boy & Girl as Boy
1968: Two Comrades Were Serving as Sergei Lukashevich
 1969: Mama Married as Boris Golubev
1969: Family Happiness as Ivan Shchupaltsev
1969: Not Under the Jurisdiction as Seryozha's voice (role played by Vladimir Kuznetsov)
1971: Telegram as Gleb, Zina's son
1974: Under en steinhimmel as Lyosha Vasilyev
1974: Take Aim as Fedya
1974: Ivan and Marya as Marquis
1979: A Few Days from the Life of I. I. Oblomov as Olga's visitor
 1979: Little Tragedies as Alber, young baron
 1983: Wartime Romance as Aleksandr Netuzhilin
1984: Another Man's Wife and a Husband Under the Bed as Tvorogov
1985: Trial on the Road as Young policeman (filmed in 1970)
1985: Bambi's Childhood as Adolescent Bambi
 1986: Lermontov as Mikhail Lermontov/Nikolai Gogol (also director)
 1994: The Master and Margarita as Yeshua Ha-Notsri
 1995: What a Wonderful Game as Mikhail Mikhailovich
 2008: Admiral as Nicholas II of Russia

References

External links 
 
 Biography of Nikolai Burlyayev

1946 births
20th-century Russian male actors
21st-century Russian male actors
21st-century Russian politicians
Living people
Male actors from Moscow
Gerasimov Institute of Cinematography alumni
Eighth convocation members of the State Duma (Russian Federation)
Honored Artists of the RSFSR
People's Artists of Russia
Recipients of the Lenin Komsomol Prize
Recipients of the Order of Alexander Nevsky
Recipients of the Order of Honour (Russia)
Nikolai
Russian Orthodox Christians from Russia
Russian actor-politicians
Russian film directors
Russian individuals subject to the U.S. Department of the Treasury sanctions
Russian male child actors
Russian male film actors
Russian male voice actors
Russian nationalists
Soviet film directors
Soviet male child actors
Soviet male film actors
Soviet male voice actors
Anti-Ukrainian sentiment in Russia